Anthony Steven Kalloniatis (born August 23, 1967) is an American stand-up comedian and actor, best known by his stage name Ant.

Career
Ant performed at comedy clubs across the US beginning in 1991.

In 1995, he was a semi-regular cast member on the WB series Unhappily Ever After, spending four seasons on the sitcom.

Ant appeared as a contestant on Last Comic Standing, competing in seasons two and three.

He was the host of VH1 reality series Celebrity Fit Club and was a regular judge of talent on Steve Harvey's Big Time. His television series U.S. of Ant premiered on MTV's gay-targeted Logo cable channel in the summer of 2006. Ant also frequently appeared as a commentator on shows such as VH1's Best Week Ever and CNBC's Dennis Miller, and was a regular guest on The Tyra Banks Show, The Tonight Show with Jay Leno as well as The Howard Stern Show.

In 2007, he appeared along with Snoop Dogg as a guest star on MTVs sketch comedy show Short Circuitz.

Ant appeared as a regular celebrity guest on the game show To Tell the Truth, alongside Jackée Harry, Meshach Taylor and John O'Hurley.

In 2008, he was a contestant on VH1's reality competition Celebracadabra, where celebrities trained with established magicians, and competed in an elimination-format contest. Ant was eliminated in episode 2 and brought back in episode 4, but did not go on to win.

On September 30, 2008, it was reported that Ant was suing British presenters Ant & Dec for using the name 'Ant' in the United States. The suit, among other things, alleges trademark infringement and fraud. The suit was dismissed in May 2010.

Kalloniatis is a former host of the Second Chances podcast with comedian Greg Baldwin.

References

External links

TV.com entry

1967 births
Male actors from Boston
American people of Greek descent
American male comedians
American male film actors
American male television actors
American stand-up comedians
Last Comic Standing contestants
American gay actors
Gay comedians
LGBT people from Massachusetts
Living people
20th-century American comedians
21st-century American comedians
Comedians from Massachusetts
21st-century American LGBT people
American LGBT comedians